Southern National Motorsports Park (formerly Southern National Speedway and Southern National Raceway Park) is a 4/10-mile auto racing track in Lucama, North Carolina.

History
Southern National Motorsports Park hosted 4 NASCAR Southeast Series races between 1996 and 2002. The track also hosted 7 NASCAR Whelen Southern Modified Tour events between 2006 and 2014.

The facility had one ASA National Tour race in 1998.

Between 1997 and 2014, the track also hosted 15 CARS X-1R Pro Cup Series events. 11 different drivers had won races and some of them drove in NASCAR, like Mario Gosselin, Bobby Gill, Mark McFarland, Michael Ritch, Clay Rogers and Caleb Holman.

In 2009, the track essentially closed with only a single racing event taking place on the track. The PASS South Super Late Model Series held one of their points races at the track on September 26, 2009. A USARacing Pro Cup Series event had been scheduled for August 15, 2009, but it was canceled by the series and replaced by a second race at Langley Speedway.

On Friday, October 7, 2011, Southern National Raceway Park was put up for auction, and was bought by Michael Diaz of Northern Virginia for $650,000.
Plans for the track are currently pending.

The track re-opened in 2012 as Southern National Motorsports Park with a regular racing schedule.

Between 2015 until now, CARS Super Late Model Tour hosted 6 races at the track. 6 different drivers had won races, including notable NASCAR drivers like Christopher Bell, Quin Houff, Raphaël Lessard and Bubba Pollard. In that period, the CARS Late Model Stock Tour also had run 6 races at the track, 5 different drivers had won races, including notable NASCAR drivers like Todd Gilliland, Deac McCaskill, Josh Berry and Taylor Gray.

In December 2015, the track was added to the racing simulation site iRacing.com.

On December 18, 2020, it was announced that Southern National would host an ARCA Menards Series East race for the first time on June 12, 2021.

The track would lose its ARCA East race but would gain a Carolina Pro Late Model Series and SMART Modified Tour race in 2022.

Southern National would host the richest Late Model Stock race in history, their annual Thanksgiving Classic in 2022, paying $50,000 to win. This year in 2023, the facility is celebrating its 30th anniversary.

References

External links
Official website
Southern National Motorsports Park race results at Racing-Reference
ARCA Menards Series East 2021 Schedule Announced

Sports venues in North Carolina
NASCAR tracks
Buildings and structures in Wilson County, North Carolina
1993 establishments in North Carolina
Sports venues completed in 1993